Puflett may refer to

Oliver Puflett (born 1999), an Australian soccer player
Bob Puflett (1881–1968), an Australian rules footballer